Reyes is the city capital of the José Ballivián Province in the Beni Department of northern Bolivia and as well as of the Reyes Municipality.

History
The Jesuit mission of Santos Reyes was founded in 1706. Movima Indians resided at the mission.

Infrastructure

Reyes has recently become a tourist stop before proceeding to Rurrenabaque.

Notable people
Nuvia Montenegro, a Bolivian Pageant Queen, was born in Reyes.

References

 www.ine.gov.bo

Populated places in Beni Department
Jesuit Missions of Moxos